Preemption or pre-emption may refer to:

Legal
 FDA preemption, legal theory in the United States that exempts product manufacturers from tort claims regarding Food and Drug Administration approved products
 Federal preemption, displacement of U.S. state law by U.S. Federal law
 Pre-emption rights, the right of existing shareholders in a company to buy shares offered for sale before they are offered to the public 
 Preemption (land), a type of land transfer in the United States, as in the Preemption Act of 1841
 Preemption Line, the line dividing Indian lands awarded to New York, from those awarded to the Commonwealth of Massachusetts in 1786
 State preemption, displacement of U.S. municipal law by state law

Other
 Preempt, a type of bid and a bidding tactic in contract bridge
 Preemption (computing), the interruption of a computer process without its cooperation in order to perform another task
 Preemptive war or preemptive strike
 Traffic signal preemption